Gelechia bianulella is a moth of the family Gelechiidae. It is found in North America, where it has been recorded from California, Colorado, Montana, New Mexico, Oklahoma and Texas.

References

Moths described in 1875
Gelechia